The first season of the Dutch TV series Wie is de Mol? ("Who is the Mole?") aired in the winter of 1999 and 2000. It followed the same format as its Belgian predecessor. It had 10 normal people travel to Australia to complete "challenges" to earn money for the group pot. However, one of the 10 was the Mole, a saboteur, the one person trying to sabotage the challenges. It was the job of the genuine contestants to earn money and unmask the Mole at the same time. Every few days, players would take a 20-question multiple choice quiz about the identity of the Mole, with the player with the most wrong answers being "executed" from the game, until 3 would be left in the finale. The player who answered the most questions right in the last quiz (consisting of 40 questions) won the money collected by the group.

In the end, housewife Deborah was revealed to be the Mole. Student Petra unmasked her and won the money, beating manager Robin in the final quiz.

Contestants 
The game was played by ten ordinary Dutch people.

Episodes
For more information, see: List of seasons of "Wie is de Mol?"

Assignments

Episode 1 
 The contestants arrived in Australia and met their host, Angela Groothuizen. Except for the Mole themselves, nobody knows what the game is really about. Only on their second day, during breakfast, Angela tells the group about the concept: The ten of them will be trying to complete missions to add money to the group pot. The Mole, however, tries to sabotage these assignments. Every few days, the player who knows least about the identity of the mole gets "executed" and has to leave the game. When three are left, the winner will win all of the collected money.
 For the first challenge, the group has to divide into two groups of five. One of the groups will travel twenty-five kilometers and the other group will travel fifty meters. The 25 km group consists of Robin, Sandy, Wilmie, Arnoud and Warner. They have to drive through the jungle in a jeep, covering a total distance of twenty-five kilometers in at most two hours. The other group (Willy, John, Foke, Deborah, and Petra) will each dive ten meters (making a total of 50m) down to collect a tablet with a word on it. Then, they will have to make a sentence with those words. Both tasks can (separately) earn the group ƒ 7500.The jeep gets stuck in the mud and some divers bring up words that are hard to make a sentence with, but both tasks succeed, bringing the pot to ƒ 15,000.
 On Day 2, the players have to learn how to play the didgeridoo. If someone manages to play the didgeridoo for 1 minute straight at any point in the game, they earn ƒ 2500.

Episode 2 
 The remaining nine players have to divide themselves into a group of three and a group of six. The group of three consisted of Foke, John, and Arnoud. They have to organize a party in a pub which will attract Aussies. At the end of the evening, they will have to make 100 Australians participate in a Dutch dance called the "Polonaise". The other six have to divide into two groups of three: Petra, Robin, and Willy and Warner, Deborah, and Wilmie. Willy then gets five questions. He must decide who will answer it: either Petra or Robin. In the end, Petra and Robin each answer a question wrong. The answers to these two questions have not been found yet, and now Willy has to get them... from a crocodile cage. He is dead scared of crocodiles but he manages to get the answers. In group two, Warner has to divide the questions. Deborah gets two questions and gets one wrong. The other three are all for Wilmie, who gets all of them wrong. So Warner will have to get the four answers from a tank full of sharks. He gets them all very quickly, so the money is won. They earned ƒ 5000. Meanwhile, the party group has failed their challenge, since there were only about twenty people participating in the dance. They earn nothing.
 The contestants gathered at the Tully River where they went rafting. There nine envelopes scattered around their route, but only one of them contained the prize money: ƒ 5000. Petra and Deborah fell out of the raft. In the end, 5 envelopes were collected, but none of them contained money. Nothing was earned.

Episode 3 
 The contestants arrived at a bridge where the host told them that a certain number of them had to do a bungee jump. That "certain number" was eight; which means that all contestants had to jump. Petra, Arnoud, John, and Warner jump without showing fear. Foke jumps while letting out a huge scream, followed by Foke. Only Deborah and Wilmie are left. She cries and is afraid and it takes thirty minutes before she jumps. Deborah makes the jump too. ƒ 15,000 is added to the pot.
 The day after the bungee jumping, host Angela asks for a slim and a heavy person. They choose Petra (slim) and Robin (heavy). They are taken away, while the others fly to an abandoned island. They have to survive twenty-four hours on the island and provide 2 liters of coconut milk and a fish for each contestant on the island. John and Warner do almost all of the work. The milk is provided rather quickly, but the group has trouble with the fish, and the only ones actually trying to catch fish are John and Warner. The challenge fails.
 While the others are on the island, Petra and Robin are taken to a hotel where they get spoiled with drinks and a massage. Later on, they have to taste meaty Australian delicacies while a cook tells them what animal it's made of. The next day, they go to the island where the other contestants each have to taste one of the delicacies that the duo ate the day before. They have to describe the taste, so Petra and Robin can guess what the contestant is eating. They need to guess four out of six correct to earn ƒ 5000. Wilmie and Arnoud don't want to eat their piece, because they're vegetarians. Deborah spits her piece out. The challenge failed - no money is earned.

Episode 4 
 After John has left, the host tells the contestants that only one of them can go to their bed. After the group draws straws, Petra is chosen to go because she drew the shortest straw. She is not happy about it since she misses out on info which will possibly be asked for in the upcoming questionnaire. The others participate in the challenge.
 The 6 contestants (sans Petra) divide into three pairs of two. One half of each pair will walk through a dark maze while the other half guides them, using footage recorded by the camera above the maze. If the "walker" gets to the other end of the maze without getting caught by the hunters in the maze within 2 minutes, they win. Only one pair has to succeed to win ƒ 7500. Deborah, who is navigating the maze, and Warner, who is guiding Deborah, are first up. Just before reaching the exit, Deborah is caught. Foke and Robin fail too. It is up to Wilmie and Arnoud and they succeed. ƒ 7500 are earned.
 The next day, the group has to split up. Four contestants will participate in a challenge at sea and three in a challenge on the land. The sea contestants are Arnoud, Wilmie, Deborah, and Foke. They have to take pictures of whales they spot while they're on a boat. They have to take a picture of a whale's head, a tail, and four whales together. Each one of them can take four pictures. Wilmie gets seasick and lays down on the deck. In the end, they couldn't find four whales together. They have a huge discussion during dinner, which leads to Petra walking away.
 The members of the land group have to participate in three sports: archery, boomerang throwing, and go-karting. There are three people who will be their opponents. Each one of them is a champion at one of the sports. The trick for the group is to set themselves up in a certain sport against the person who isn't the champion at that sport, so they can win. Each contestant participates in a sport. Only one of them has to win their match to win ƒ 5000 for the pot. Robin thinks the female opponent is the archery champion, but Petra and Warner won't listen to him. Warner loses boomerang throwing against an aboriginal. Petra has a great try-out round in go-karting but loses in her real match. When Robin faces off against the woman in archery, it turns out that she is, in fact, the champion. Robin loses and nothing is earned.

Episode 5 
 The host asks for two contestants who like air, and four who like land. Foke and Arnoud are the group of two. They are taken by boat to an island. At the other side of the woods, the other four are preparing for the challenge. They have to cross the woods one at a time and get to the top of the hill where Foke and Arnoud are. However, there are two hunters in the woods. Two contestants have to cross the woods without getting caught in order to win the money. Wilmie is first and gets caught. Petra is next and arrives at the top of the hill after falling into a swamp twice. Deborah is third and does a good job at first, but eventually, hunters find her, chase her, and capture her. It's up to Robin now and he wins it. ƒ 10,000 is added to the pot.
 After the previous challenge, the players have to negotiate about sleeping places. There are six choices, varying from a villa to a sleeping bag. Arnoud eventually gets the villa, and an important choice to make regarding the next challenge (he chooses the bolded option): 
 Make it more difficult for the group to succeed, earning him an exemption from the quiz.
 Make it easier to succeed, but forfeiting the exemption and having to change sleeping places with the person in the sleeping bag.
 The group is in Maryborough. Each contestant, except for Arnoud, has to pick an envelope, containing a hard challenge and one that is somewhat easier. Contestants roll a die to see which challenge they get; one to two means easy, four to six means hard. All challenges have to be completed by the group to win the money.Foke is first. She has to wear one arm in a cast until the evening, and accepts the challenge. Petra is next and has to stay in a barrel for an hour while being accompanied by mice. She takes the challenge as well. The same goes for Robin, who has to pose for a painting in his underwear. Fourth is Deborah. She has to get a tattoo, but even though she already has one, she declines. Last is Wilmie, who has to get her hair painted - the natural brown-haired woman paints her hair blonde. Not everybody has done their challenge, so no money is won. Then everybody waits for Arnoud.The host tells the group that Arnoud had to do all the challenges that the group declined. If he did complete said assignments, the group still gets their money, and, against the group's expectations, he got the tattoo, so ƒ 10,000 is earned.

Episode 6 
 The group has to split into a duo and a trio. The duo consists of Wilmie and Robin. Both groups have to get to Byron Bay before sunset to earn the prize money. They have to get there by hitchhiking, and all the while, filming Aussies telling the camera what they know about the Netherlands. Many things go wrong, which leads to the group failing the assignment.
 The next day, the host asks for a sporty person, which is Petra, but in a twist, the other four contestants are the ones that actually participate in the upcoming sports challenge. The four contestants have to complete this course in ninety minutes; however, only the time the slowest player takes to finish matters. First, they ride bicycles to the beach, where they run along the coast to find two kayaks. They use these kayaks to get to the other side of a mountain, which they then have to climb until they arrive at the finish, a lighthouse. The group does good at cycling and running, but Deborah and Wilmie keel over with their kayak and Wilmie almost drowns. Robin and Deborah, the younger contestants, are the first to get to the finish, while Arnoud and Wilmie have more trouble. They eventually arrive at the finish with 34 seconds to spare. Afterward, the sporters get to know what Petra has been up to.
 While the others were running the round of Byron Bay, Petra had to find a disguise for herself, as well as people to sit with her on a field under the lighthouse. The others now have to spot Petra. If they are right, money is won. But if they're wrong, Petra gets an exemption. They get it wrong, so she is safe at the next execution.

Episode 7 
 Byron Bay is known for its waves. Now, two of the contestants will have to go surfing on those waves. If both of them stay on for five seconds, they win ƒ 5000. The challenge is taken by Petra and Deborah. Both keep falling off, but eventually, Petra manages to stand on the board for 7 seconds. It's now up to Deborah to win the money, but she can't. The challenge failed.Meanwhile, Wilmie and Robin have another challenge. They have to perform a circus act involving trapezes. They try and practice, but Robin's calf starts to hurt when they only have thirty minutes left to practice the act. They quit the challenge.
 Once again, the contestants play the challenges in pairs. Wilmie and Deborah have to travel to an inland town called Nimbin. They have to create a choir with townspeople in it, and then teach them a Dutch song. Another Aussie then has to pick the sheet which has the music notes and songtext of the performed song on it. They try to turn the Dutch text into English ones that sound the same. At 4.00 pm the choir starts singing. And the Australian girl listening actually picks the right sheet! ƒ 5000 is earned.
 The host shows Petra and Robin two bracelets. They have to figure out which one is fake (worth ƒ 5) and which one is real (worth ƒ 5000). If they throw the fake one away in the end, they win ƒ 5000 - however, if they throw the real one away, they lose ƒ 5000. They can travel to the town's center, but they can't take the bracelets, nor can they bring a jeweler with them to see the bracelets. Petra draws both bracelets and when they are in the town's center, they find 2 jewelers who can help them. Afterward, they meet the host at a cliff. Petra hands her the bracelet they think is fake. After the host has thrown it into the sea, she reveals that she just threw away ƒ 5000.

Episodes 8 & 9 
There were no assignments during these two episodes because these episodes were dedicated to the winner reveal, mole reveal, and reunion.

Reception

Viewing Figures

See also 
Wie is de Mol? – Main article in Dutch

References 

01
1999 Dutch television seasons
2000 Dutch television seasons
Television shows set in Australia
Television shows filmed in Australia